The Mark Four was an English rock band from Hertfordshire, England that was formed in 1961.  Members included Kenny Pickett (vocals), Eddie Phillips (guitar), John Dalton (bass), Mick Thompson (guitar) and Jack Jones (drums).

The group recorded its first single in March 1964, and released it in May of the same year. Three more singles followed, the last of which was released February 1966. During this span the group would perform regularly, even seven days a week. The group even opened for a new club in Wilhelmshaven, Germany called 'The Big Ben Club'.

Dalton left to join The Kinks on 31 October 1965, and Bob Garner replaced him. Soon after this line-up change, they became The Creation, and went on to record singles between 1966 and 1968, including the Top 40 hit, "Painter Man".

References

English pop music groups
English rock music groups
Musical groups established in 1961
Musical groups disestablished in 1965